The 2022 North Dakota State Bison softball team was an American college softball team that represented North Dakota State University during the 2022 NCAA Division I softball season. The Bison were led by Darren Mueller in his twenty-first season, and played their home games at Tharaldson Park. They competed in the Summit League. 
The Bison finished the season with a 30-23 record, and a 10-8 record in Summit League play. NDSU made it to the Summit League Tournament as the 3 seed. They defeated North Dakota and Omaha, before falling to South Dakota State and Omaha in the elimination game to be eliminated from contention.

Previous season
The Bison finished the 2021 season 11–12 in Summit League play and 16–29 on the season. They entered the Summit League tournament as the 3 seed but lost to North Dakota in the first round, 5–6 in 10 innings.

Personnel

Roster

Coaching staff

Schedule

Awards and honors
First Team All-Summit League
Dez Cardenas
Cameryn Maykut
Second Team All-Summit League
Paige Vargas
Emilee Buringa
Reanna Rudd
Summit League All-Tournament Team
Paige Vargas
Skylar Padgett
Nicole Licea

References 

North Dakota State Bison softball
2022 Summit League softball season
2022 in sports in North Dakota